These are the official results of the Women's 4x100 metres event at the 2003 IAAF World Championships in Paris, France. Their final was held on Saturday 30 August 2001 at 19:45h.

Final

Heats
Held on Friday 29 August 2003

Heat 1

Heat 2

Heat 3

References
 
 

 
Relays at the World Athletics Championships
4 × 100 metres relay
2003 in women's athletics